STS-121 was a 2006 NASA Space Shuttle mission to the International Space Station (ISS) flown by . The main purposes of the mission were to test new safety and repair techniques introduced following the Columbia disaster of February 2003 as well as to deliver supplies, equipment and German European Space Agency (ESA) astronaut Thomas Reiter to the ISS.

After two weather-related delays, the shuttle successfully launched on Tuesday, July 4, 2006, at 14:37:55 EDT. It was the first and only shuttle launch on the United States' Independence Day. The mission lasted for 13 days before landing at the Kennedy Space Center on July 17, 2006, at 09:14:43 EDT.

STS-121 was also designated the ISS Assembly Mission ULF 1.1. As the mission followed on from STS-114 in carrying out the recommendations made in response to the Columbia Accident Investigation Board report, it was considered a Return to Flight test mission. Its successful launch and landing led NASA to fully resume regular Space Shuttle launches in the construction of the ISS.

Crew

Crew notes 
Thomas Reiter's position was previously planned to be filled by Sergey Volkov (Russia) before the launch of STS-121 was postponed until July 2006.

British-born astronaut Piers Sellers replaced Carlos Noriega who was originally scheduled to be on the STS-121 mission NASA announced on Thursday, July 15, 2004. This was due to an undisclosed, temporary medical condition.

The transfer of Reiter to the ISS returned the station to a three crew member staffing level. After the loss of Columbia and the grounding of the Shuttle fleet, only two people had been residing on the ISS.

Shuttle hardware 
 External Tank: ET-119
 Solid Rocket Boosters: BI-126 & RSRM-93
 SSMEs: s/n 2045, 2051, 2056
 OMS engines: LP-01/35 RP-03/33

Mission background
During the STS-121 mission to the International Space Station (ISS), the crew of  continued to test new equipment and procedures for the inspection and repair of the thermal protection system that is designed to increase the safety of the Space Shuttles. It also delivered more supplies and cargo for future ISS expansion.

After the Columbia accident, NASA decided that two test flights would be required and that activities that were originally assigned to STS-114 would need to be divided into two missions because of the addition of post-Columbia safety tests. Before the accident, Columbia had been assigned to missions STS-118 and STS-121.

The STS-121 mission was originally to have sent Columbia to service the Hubble Space Telescope. However, that servicing mission was given another designation on the manifest before the disaster and the designation of STS-121 once again became available. Since STS-115 through STS-120 were already delegated to existing missions, NASA selected the lowest available mission designation for the second test flight. Hence, the mission following STS-114 is STS-121.

The STS-121 test flight mission was originally to be flown aboard Atlantis in September 2005, after  flew STS-114, but a problem with the landing gear of Atlantis moved Discovery ahead to fly STS-121. After the return of Discovery to California following the completion of STS-114, scheduling again changed. Atlantis was moved up to fly the STS-115 mission (whose launch was planned for August 2006) and Discovery was to fly the STS-121 mission as originally planned. The launch of the STS-121 mission was delayed until July 2006 as well, due to an unresolved foam debris and the Engine Cut Off (ECO) sensor issue from STS-114.

On May 12, 2006, Discovery was moved from the Orbiter Processing Facility to the Vehicle Assembly Building, where it was mated to its External Tank and SRBs. Rollout to Pad 39B occurred on May 19, 2006, ahead of the planned launch, during the July 2006 launch window, which existed for about ten minutes each day between July 1 and 19.

Equipment delivered to the ISS

Key items delivered, as part of over 2 tons of cargo included:
Multi Purpose Logistics Module (MPLM) Leonardo on its 4th flight, 7th MPLM overall, carrying:

−80 °C Freezer
This freezer is known as the Minus Eighty Degree Laboratory Freezer for ISS (MELFI). The French-built unit comprises four independent drawers which can be set to operate at different temperatures. Initially, temperatures of  will be used during on-orbit ISS operations. Both reagents and samples will be stored in the freezer. As well as storage, the freezer is designed to be used to transport samples to and from the ISS in a temperature controlled environment.

The European Modular Cultivation System (EMCS) for biological experiments.
This consists of a gas tight incubator in which there are two centrifuges, each able to carry four experimental cartridges. Two "Ground controls"—exact copies of the equipment and experiments—will be run on the ground, one in Europe and one at NASA's Ames Research Center.
New oxygen generation system
This device is considered a test for an equipment design with potential for use on proposed future long durations to the Moon and Mars. The system will initially run below its maximum capacity, though it is designed for enabling the ISS to support a crew of six in the future. It will supplement the Russian-built Elektron system operating in the Zvezda module.

New cycling machine for the ISS crew
A Danish built device, the Cycle Ergometer with Vibration Isolation System (CEVIS)

Replacement common cabin air assembly heat exchanger used to control the internal air temperature of the ISS.

All of the above equipment was installed in the Destiny Laboratory Module.

Also carried in the payload bay was an Integrated Cargo Carrier with the Trailing Umbilical System (TUS) for the Mobile Transporter       
(returning old one), an EATCS/Pump Module (PM), two Fixed Grapple Bars for PM and TUS relocation during EVA and an LMC carrying the DTO-848 TPS Repair Box.

Mission timeline

The shuttle was docked to the ISS for the majority of the flight. For much of the time the shuttle was at the ISS the Multi-Purpose Logistics Module Leonardo was mated and accessible to the crew for the transfer of equipment, supplies, returned experiments and trash.
Three spacewalks were carried out on the mission, the third was dependent on sufficient consumables being available and two alternate timelines were planned, with and without the final spacewalk. There were also additional "Get Ahead" tasks planned for the crew to do at the ISS if they found themselves with more time than planned, one such get ahead task was completed on EVA 2. The crew were able to take the majority of one day off, during which they explored the ISS, took photographs, and conducted press interviews.

Events throughout the day went according to plan, one exception being an abnormal temperature reading on thruster L5L (see Pre-launch concerns). The launch window was from 3:48:41 to 3:53:02 pm at 3:42, while in the T-9 built-in hold, mission control decided to postpone launch because anvil (thunderstorm) clouds and lightning were detected within  of the launch area and path. Launch was rescheduled for July 2 at 15:26. STS-121 was the first launch during which NASA took special precautions to deter vultures, particularly the local turkey vulture, from flying over the area. Efforts included the swift removal of roadkill and other dead animals from areas around the launch site. This followed a near miss during STS-114.

Again, the countdown continued according to schedule with a launch time of 15:26. At 09:30 on July 2, 2006, the NASA launch blog reported that the "shuttle weather officer forecasts a 70-percent chance of weather prohibiting a launch this afternoon due to thunderstorms and anvil clouds. There is a 60-percent chance of weather prohibiting launch should there be a 24-hour turnaround, and a 40-percent chance with a 48-hour delay. If we scrub today due to weather, mission managers will meet later to decide if they want to make a third consecutive launch attempt or stand down for one day and try again on Tuesday."

At 13:14, the launch director made a final decision to scrub again due to unfavorable weather conditions. The next launch attempt was scheduled for around 14:38 pm on July 4, 2006.

The shuttle's fuel cells were replenished to improve the chances of having enough electrical power on orbit to enable the third planned space walk to take place.

Cracks and a region where a piece of foam had come off were discovered in the insulation on the upper part of the external fuel tanks. The foam came off a bracket which held an oxygen line in place. The thermal stresses of repeated filling and emptying the fuel tank with the cryogenic fuel are known to cause a degree of damage to the insulation foam.

At 08:35 the backup circuit breaker controlling the primary heaters on the segment joints of both solid rocket boosters were noticed to have failed. Consideration was given to a repair on the pad. However, this was not done as the heaters are only used in colder weather, and the primary heater was functional.

For the third launch attempt, there was only a 20% chance of weather preventing launch according to NASA.

At 14:37:55 Eastern Daylight Time, Space Shuttle Discovery launched from the Kennedy Space Center at Cape Canaveral, Florida. This was the third attempt at launch. It was also the first US Space Shuttle to launch on the United States' Independence Day.

During and after launch much attention was paid to monitoring the external tank for the loss of insulation foam. The shuttle was equipped with a number of new cameras, and video was also taken from spotter planes. Each solid rocket booster contained three cameras – one to monitor the separation, and two focused on the leading edge. The video from these was not to be broadcast, but recorded for later retrieval from the solid rocket boosters. A further camera was placed on the external tank, as during STS-114, to broadcast live images on NASA TV during launch. The first thing two of the crew from the mid-deck did when the main engines cut out was leave their seats to take photographs and video of the external tank. One of the factors that was potentially affecting the choice of day within the launch window was the lighting conditions for this imagery, as the sun's slightly different angle on the different days affected the location of shadows on the external tank. However, the day to day difference in lighting was determined to be relatively unimportant, particularly as the lighting conditions depended to a great degree on a more unpredictable factor – the degree to which the external tank tumbles on separation.

During the launch, NASA TV broadcast a view from the external tank camera mounted between the Shuttle and the external tank. Unlike the previous two missions, no foam breakage or foam pieces were easily seen falling off the tank. However, upon close inspection of the many cameras covering the launch NASA determined that several small pieces of debris were seen jetting away from the tank. Generally, though, these were seen after the time NASA was most concerned about.

Approximately 23 minutes into the flight, further debris was observed floating beside the orbiter as reported by Mission Specialist Michael Fossum. His transmission was broadcast live on NASA TV. Fossum initially described the debris as a  piece with straps attached, a description which would fit a thermal protection system blanket. Such a blanket was noted to be flapping on the previous mission, STS-114, but was not of concern, as it protects a section of the vehicle which does not get particularly hot. Analysis of video images on the ground has indicated that the debris observed was strips of ice formed on the outside of an engine nozzle, which sublimated and disintegrated during observation. Very similar ice formations were seen on earlier missions.

Video analysis also revealed a tile shim which came out during main engine start.

The orbital maneuvering system thruster in which a heater failed prior to launch (see Pre-launch concerns) was warmed by pointing it at the sun, enabling it to be used during ISS rendezvous docking operations.

En route to the ISS, the -long Orbiter Boom Sensor System (OBSS) tipped with two types of lasers and a high-resolution television camera was used to inspect the underside of the shuttle for damage. Particular attention was paid to the leading edges of the shuttle's wings.

The post mission management team briefing after flight day 2 revealed that the inspections had found that a gap filler was protruding on the port side lower wing, not a location of particular concern. The gap filler was not from an area which has been modified since STS-114; it had been with the vehicle since 1982.

An analysis of the inspections revealed the presence of bird droppings on the leading edge of the right wing. The launch director said he saw droppings in that location before launch. During the crew press conference on landing day, the crew joked about the bird droppings, indicating that they were still present on the orbiter though rather charred.

Following rendezvous with the ISS, the shuttle performed a rendezvous pitch maneuver prior to docking to allow the ISS crew to briefly inspect and photograph the Shuttle's heat shield. An uneventful docking with the space station was performed. Thomas Reiter officially became a member of the International Space Station Expedition 13 crew shortly after docking; the transfer of his personalised Soyuz spacecraft seat liner, which cushions the landing, indicated the official transfer point.

The Multi-Purpose Logistics Module Leonardo was mated to the space station's Unity module. There were concerns that some straps were in the way of the docking equipment, but following video inspections of the straps they were determined not to be a problem and docking continued as planned.

A number of focused inspections of the Shuttle's heat shield were conducted while it was docked to the ISS.

The results of analysis of data collected by the wing leading edge sensors were discussed in the post mission management meeting briefing at the conclusion of flight day 4. The sensors were revealed to have picked up six impacts. The maximum g observed was 1.6 g, compared to ground testing where impacts producing on the order of 10 g were required to cause damage.

Michael Fossum and Piers Sellers performed a -hour space walk. They evaluated the use of the  Orbital Boom Sensor System extension to Shuttle's Canadarm as a work platform in case repairs are needed to the shuttle. The first step was to attach the foot restraints to the arm. First Piers Sellers worked alone; then Mike Fossum joined him – when both are on the arm they attempted increasingly vigorous operations that simulate various potential repair scenarios.

Initial reports from Michael Fossum and Piers Sellers suggested that the boom was damping out motion rapidly, making it a good work platform. Piers Sellers said at one point: "I felt almost no motions at all, just a few inches each way, very few motions". When standing on the boom while it was moving they described it as very smooth.

Upon realising the mistake Fossum said: "Oh no! ... That's embarrassing". The damaged tether had to be switched for a spare.

The other major task was to make safe a cable cutter on the ISS's mobile transporter.

The morning's flight plan revision emailed up to the crew contained the following request:

One of the day's highlights was a press conference from orbit, with questions from JSC, KSC, and the ESA.

Robotics operations continued, with the Canadarm2 releasing the mobile transporter from one end, while remaining attached with the other end to the Destiny module in preparation for the following day's work on the mobile transporter system. Other preparations for the second space walk continued, including the setting up of equipment, and cameras.

Additionally a new spacesuit being delivered to the ISS was transferred and underwent "checkout" procedures.

Sellers and Fossum performed a 6-hour, 47-minute space walk. They deployed a spare pump module and replaced a reel of umbilical cable carrying power, data and video for operating the station's Mobile Transporter rail car.

The astronauts also continued cargo transfers between the shuttle, the International Space Station and the Leonardo multi-purpose logistics module. Leonardo arrived with more than 7,400 pounds of equipment and supplies for the station. Leonardo will be returned Friday to the payload bay packed with more than 4,300 pounds of science experiment results, unneeded items and trash.

At 10:35 EDT, President George W. Bush had a private telephone conversation with the crew, during which he told the astronauts that they represent the best of service and exploration, and thanked them for the job they are doing.

Pilot Mark Kelly suggested during an on-orbit press conference that the wake-up songs should be made known to the crew before they are woken up by them when he said:

A third and final spacewalk to demonstrate shuttle repair techniques was carried out by Sellers and Fossum. Repairs were done on pre-damaged samples of heat shield materials brought into space on a special pallet in the payload bay of the shuttle. The repairs were expected to work best when the material has been warm and is cooling, so the actions were carefully coordinated by mission control with regard to exposure of the samples to sunlight. While the procedures, and NOAX (Non-Oxide Adhesive Experimental) material had been tested in a vacuum on Earth, the zero-G tests were required because of offgassing from the material and the potential for bubbles to form that could weaken the structure of the repair.

Following a problem on the previous EVA where latches on a SAFER became detached, Kapton tape was used to ensure the latches remained closed on this EVA.

Sellers lost one of the spatulas he was using to put the NOAX onto the samples of heat shield material. He tried to locate it himself with the assistance of Fossum, who said "Don't worry it happens."  Mission controllers saw the spatula float away over the port side of the shuttle payload bay. The loose tool was determined not to pose a hazard to the mission.

The Space Shuttle Discovery (STS-121) crew enjoyed a day off after having completed three successful space walks and transferring thousands of pounds of supplies and equipment earlier in the flight.

Mission Specialist Mike Fossum received a call from Texas Governor Rick Perry, who, like Fossum, is a graduate of the Texas A&M University. He mentioned to Fossum how proud he was to have the first Aggie in space. "Aggies are all up in great arms to have the first Aggie in space," said Perry. "You are making some history, Michael."

Later in the afternoon, Fossum and Nowak participated in live interviews with MSNBC and Fox News Live.

Expedition 13 crewmember Jeffrey Williams confirmed steps and final procedures for closeout of the MPLM which will be relocated from the International Space Station to Discoverys payload bay.
Transfer of Leonardo to the shuttle payload bay was completed in preparation for Discoverys departure from the International Space Station. Wilson and Nowak used the Canadarm2 to complete the transfer of the module packed with over 4000 pounds of material to return to Earth.

Wilson and Nowak also used the shuttle's arm and extension boom to inspect the shuttle's port wing for any signs of micro-meteoroid damage while on-orbit. The other wing and the nose cap were inspected on flight day 12 following undocking.

Major discussion on the ground occurred concerning a small leak, an "APU [auxiliary power unit] 1 fuel tank pressure decay", in either a nitrogen or hydrazine tank, in one of the three redundant auxiliary power units which generate hydraulic power for use controlling the flight control surfaces during landing. Ultimately, tests performed after ISS undocking increased confidence in the integrity of the APU to the point where mission controllers decided to use the unit as normal for the re-entry.

Space Shuttle Discoverys STS 121 crew undocked from International Space Station after a 9-day stay. Undocking occurred over the Pacific Ocean just north of New Zealand.

Mark Kelly flew Discovery to a point above the station before performing the final separation burn.

Crew members also used the Canadarm and the orbital boom sensor system to perform final inspections of the starboard wing and shuttle nosecap for any damage that may have been caused by orbital debris while docked with the International Space Station.

Troubleshooting of one of the Flash Evaporator Subsystem (FES) (FES PRI B) was carried out. FES A was to be used during reentry but it was desirable to have both functional. This was in addition to the usual extensive checkout of all systems required for reentry ensuring they were functional.

Other activities included a long series of live press conferences from orbit, and preparations for landing, which included stowing items on the middeck, fitting the seats in place, and the CDR and Pilot practicing a simulated landing.

Discovery received a clean bill of health on the recent heat shield inspections and was given a Go for landing. There were only two very minor deviations from a nominal landing procedure planned: APU 1 was started early, and, due to the problems with the heater thermostat on APU 3, the heater was turned off manually by one of the crew.

Atmospheric reentry and landing at Kennedy Space Center's Shuttle Landing Facility.

Detailed timeline of landing:

3:13 am CDT Deorbit Prep begins
4:24 am CDT Payload Bay Doors Closing
4:36 am CDT MCC "Go" for Ops 3 Transition
5:40 am CDT Clothing Configuration
6:04 am CDT Seat Ingress
6:16 am CDT OMS Gimbal Check
6:30 am CDT APU Prestart
6:45 am CDT MCC "Go-No Go" Decision for the Deorbit Burn
6:52 am CDT Maneuver to the Deorbit Burn Attitude
7:07 am CDT Deorbit Burn
8:14 am CDT Landing at KSC'''
8:15 am CDT Wheels stop

The deorbit burn phase began successfully at 7:07 am CDT, committing Discovery to land on the 17th. At 8:08 am CDT, Discovery was safely out of reentry and headed toward a landing at KSC runway 15. The original landing target (Runway 33) was ruled out at the last minute due to showers south of KSC where the orbiter would have circled before landing. Shortly before landing the right air data probe initially failed to deploy. It began functioning of its own accord a few minutes later.Discovery landed successfully on schedule at 09:14:43 EDT with three good APUs throughout the landing procedure. During the post landing inspection tour, Lindsey remarked that this was one of the cleanest inspections he'd ever done.

During post landing press briefings it was stated that:Discoverys windows would be replaced before the next mission, STS-116, so that the old ones can be studied by engineers at Corning to find out the cause of small imperfections which appeared during the mission.
The mission's demonstration that the shuttle's arm can be used as a work platform was a good sign for a potential future Hubble Space Telescope servicing mission.
The Space Shuttle Program is "back in business".

 Additional personnel 
As well as the shuttle crew, the ISS crew was key to this mission. The ISS crew included:
Commander Pavel Vinogradov and Flight Engineer Jeffrey Williams.

CAPCOM – those responsible for speaking on the radio to the Shuttle from mission control were:

Steve Frick / Rick Sturckow During Ascent/Descent;
Rick Mastracchio / Lee Archambault while in Orbit; Julie Payette for ISS Operations

The launch director was Michael D. Leinbach; the flight director's position in mission control was held by Steve Stich during launch and re-entry and by Tony Ceccacci / Norm Knight during orbital operations.

Wake-up calls
A tradition for NASA spaceflights since the days of Gemini, mission crews are played a special musical track at the start of each day in space. Each track is specially chosen, often by their family, and usually has special meaning to an individual member of the crew, or is applicable to their daily activities.

Contingency planning
There are various contingency plans for failures occurring during and immediately after launch, known as abort modes. If the comprehensive inspections of the shuttle's heat shield which was conducted once the vehicle was in orbit had suggested that it would not be able to survive a re-entry, or another problem occurred, then Atlantis'', commanded by Brent Jett, would have been used to mount the STS-301 rescue mission which involves the shuttle crew transferring to the ISS then awaiting rescue. STS-121 was the first shuttle mission to carry an 8.5-meter cable designed to connect the flight deck manual controls used during landing to an avionics bay in the middeck allowing mission controllers to land the shuttle uncrewed if required. However the Rescue Flight Resource Book released following STS-121 states that a controlled break-up rather than a landing was planned for a disabled shuttle.

One of the contingency plans most likely to be put into action was a landing at alternate site (primarily Dryden Flight Research Center and Edwards Air Force Base) in the event of bad weather at KSC. In addition to the specific plans, NASA had a generic "mishap response plan", and the shuttle software was pre-loaded with information on a large number of airfields that were potential landing sites. In many cases, the airfields were unaware of their presence in the shuttle software.

STS-300
STS-300 was the designation given to the Contingency Shuttle Crew Support mission which would have launched in the event Space Shuttle Discovery became disabled during STS-114 or STS-121. The rescue mission for STS-114 was a modified version of the STS-121 mission, which would have involved the launch date being brought forward. If needed, it would have launched no earlier than August 11, 2005. The crew for this mission was a 4-person subset of the full STS-121 crew:
Steven Lindsey, Commander and backup Remote Manipulator System (RMS) operator
Mark Kelly, Pilot and prime RMS operator
Michael E. Fossum, Mission Specialist 1 and Extravehicular 2
Piers Sellers, Mission Specialist 2 and Extravehicular 1

Pre-launch concerns
Following the flight readiness review meeting which concluded on June 17, 2006, NASA's Chief Engineer Christopher Scolese and Chief Safety and Mission Assurance Officer Bryan O'Connor, who served as pilot on STS-61-B and commanded STS-40, decided that from their point of view they were going to recommend that the shuttle not be flown. O'Connor later expanded this to explain that this is due to the potential for the loss of the vehicle; he supported the collective decision to fly, however, especially given the option for the crew to stay on the ISS and await rescue if the shuttle is unable to return to earth. Both Scolese and O'Connor included notes explaining their position in their entries in the official plans.

Statement by Scolese and O'Connor as released by NASA:

NASA's public affairs office had said following the flight readiness review that O'Connor and Scolese would not talk to the media about their objections. On June 20 it was reported that O'Connor was readily agreeing to interviews and also said the statement was actually written by the public affairs office and agreed by the two officials.

On the morning of the first launch attempt, on July 1, concerns included weather, external fuel tank foam, and a thruster failure. The thruster failure was detected via abnormally low thermostat readings in one of the left Orbital Maneuvering System (OMS) pods. The thruster in question – L5L, one of 38 – was considered inoperable. The plan was not to fix the problem, but to ensure that any reduction in maneuverability resulting from the failure is within the limits that the crew can cope with on orbit. Thruster L5L became operational again after mission managers decided to use sunlight to warm up the thruster to normal operational levels and it was able to be used during the docking procedures with the ISS.

Mission coverage
NASA's simulation website was regularly updated as the launch approached. Shortly after launch NASA TV online and via cable was seriously disrupted by a thunderstorm over Goddard Space Flight Center from where NASA TV is uplinked to satellites for distribution.

The entire mission was covered on NASA TV and was available online worldwide, on cable, and on satellite in the USA. In the United States, CNN, C-SPAN, FOX News, HDNet, and MSNBC had live coverage of the launch and landing.

Media

See also

 2006 in spaceflight
 List of human spaceflights
 List of Space Shuttle missions
 Outline of space science
 Space Shuttle program

References

External links
 Official NASA Internet Site
 Official NASA Space Shuttle Internet Site
 STS-121 mission overview
 Additional NASA STS-121 mission info
 NASA mission summary Dec 2003
 Spacefacts page of STS-121
 STS-121 mission info  – this site contains info about the STS-121 mission, crew, objectives, as well as images, a podcast, and quite a bit of video related to the mission.
 Return to Flight: NASA's road to STS-121
 The Inoculated Mind – Interview with the scientists who sent experiments into orbit on board STS-121
 STS-121 The Full Story
 STS-121 Video Highlights 

Space Shuttle missions
Spacecraft launched in 2006
Spacecraft which reentered in 2006
Articles containing video clips